GIS Day is an annual event celebrating the technology of geographic information systems (GIS), and which first took place in 1999. It was initiated by spatial analytics software provider Esri. Esri president and co-founder Jack Dangermond credits Ralph Nader with being the person who inspired the creation of GIS Day. He considered the event a good initiative for people to learn about geography and the many uses of GIS. He wanted GIS Day to be a grassroots effort and open to everyone to participate.  

Today, the event provides an international forum for users of GIS technology from all companies to demonstrate real-world applications that are making a difference in society.

Original sponsors of GIS Day included the following organizations:

 National Geographic Society
 Association of American Geographers (AAG)
 University Consortium for Geographic Information Science (UCGIS)
 United States Geological Survey
 Library of Congress
 Sun Microsystems
 Hewlett-Packard
 Esri
 King Saud University

Upcoming dates when GIS Day will be recognized are:

 Wednesday, November 16, 2022

Additional Resources

GeoMentors Program

References

External links
GIS Day Website
Geography Awareness Week

Geographic information systems
November observances
Wednesday observances
Holidays and observances by scheduling (nth weekday of the month)